Oenothera organensis, the Organ Mountains evening-primrose, is a species of flowering plant in the family Onagraceae, native to a few valleys in the Organ Mountains of New Mexico. With only a few thousand individuals, it is nevertheless well-studied due to its complete self-incompatibility, which would seem to be maladaptive in such a rare species.

References

organensis
Endemic flora of the United States
Flora of New Mexico
Plants described in 1938
Flora without expected TNC conservation status